Moonlight Express is a 1999 Hong Kong-Japanese romance film directed by Daniel Lee and starring Leslie Cheung and Takako Tokiwa.

Plot
Hitomi, a Japanese resident, comes to Hong Kong after the death of her fiancé Tetsuya in a fatal accident to settle several important matters surrounding his demise. Although the incident was years ago, it has apparently left an indelible mark in her life as she could not forget him.

Enter Kar-bo, an undercover cop, was involved in a drug bust-up which would later incriminate him. Hitomi stumbles into him and was amazed that he looked remarkably similar to her dead lover. They soon found themselves having strong feelings for each other, although at the same time, he has to flee to China as things have gone from bad to worse for him.

What invariably follows is a constant cat-and-mouse game of running away from authorities who were tipped off as to his location and only ends when Kar-bo reached a ranch belonging to an old friend. Surprisingly, Hitomi, although conscious as to the fact that Kar-bo can never be as close to being the real Tetsuya, endures his hardships with him unfailingly and tests the resolve of both these troubled lovers.

Cast
 Leslie Cheung as Shek Kar-bo / Tetsuya Misawa
 Takako Tokiwa as Hitomi
 Michelle Yeoh as Michelle
 Yuka Hoshino as Tomoko
 Jack Kao as Gene
 Austin Wai as Officer Ko
 Liu Kai-chi as Officer Tung
 Jimmy Wong as Officer Tung's detective
 Lee Heung-kam as Tatsuya's landlady
 Mars as Officer Tung's detective
 Jude Poyer as Michelle's customer at club
 Bak Ka-sin as Mahjong player
 Sam Lee as Mahjong Player
 Rocky Lai as Taxi Driver
 Lo Yuen
 Ho Fat-ming
 Tang Chiu-ying
 Fook Tin-shun
 Chang Kin-yung as Policeman
 Simon Cheung as Policeman
 Chan Po-chun
 Lee Kim-wing

External links 
 

1999 films
1990s romance films
Hong Kong romance films
Japanese romance films
Police detective films
1990s Cantonese-language films
Films directed by Daniel Lee
Films set in Hong Kong
Films shot in Hong Kong
Films set in Japan
Films shot in Japan
1990s Hong Kong films
1990s Japanese films